Jack Deveraux is a fictional character from Days of Our Lives, an American soap opera on the NBC network, most famously played by actor Matthew Ashford since 1987.  He is a member of the Johnson family and first appeared onscreen in 1987. Ashford is the third actor to play in the role, and appeared regularly from 1987 through 1993 and from 2001 to 2006, with a few minor breaks in between, in addition to a small guest stint in 2007. In September 2011, after a four-year absence, the character returned to reconnect with his estranged family. His return was short-lived when it was announced that Ashford had been let go, last appearing on August 15, 2012, when the character was killed off in an elevator shaft. From 2016 to 2017, Ashford reprised the role for several guest-appearances; he returned full-time on December 28, 2018. The character has also been portrayed for lesser stints by actors Mark Valley, Steve Wilder, and Jon Lindstrom.

Many of his storylines have included his relationship with Jennifer Horton, which has made up one of the soap's most popular supercouples. They have two children together, Abigail Deveraux and JJ Deveraux, in addition to a grandson, Thomas DiMera and a granddaughter Charlotte DiMera, through Abigail. He recently discovered to have another daughter, Gwen Rizczech. One of the character's well known plots have been his fake deaths which occurred between 2003 and 2012, where he was presumed dead four times.

Casting 

At the character's inception in 1987, the role was played by Joseph Adams from April 10 to July 17, by James Acheson from July 21 to October 26, and by Matthew Ashford from October 30 onward. Ashford went on to play the role through October 12, 1993, reappearing from February 5, 2001, to October 27, 2003, and June 22, 2004, until September 21, 2006, with a guest appearance on April 2–4, 2007, and again from September 23, 2011, until August 15, 2012. Ashford later took a brief absence from the series from October 2003 to June 2004 where he would appear as a special guest star on One Life to Live.

Ashford was nominated for an Emmy for Outstanding Supporting Actor in 2012. During Ashford's absence, the role of Jack was played by Mark Valley from October 28, 1994, until September 26, 1997, and by Steve Wilder from September 26, 1997, through June 5, 1998.

On November 30, 2015, it was announced that Ashford would briefly return to the soap; he appeared on May 24, 2016. Ashford also briefly appeared on June 20, 2016, August 5, 2016, and August 23, 2016. He made another on-off appearance on December 21, 2017. Ashford returned full-time at the conclusion of the December 28, 2018, episode.

In December 2020, it was announced Jon Lindstrom—the real-life spouse of Cady McClain—would step-in as Ashford's body double for scenes between Jack and McClain's Jennifer. He aired on December 30 of that year.

Characterization
Charming, manipulative, heroic, clever, selfish, arrogant and self-loathing all at the same time, antihero Jack Deveraux is one half of Jack and Jennifer, one of Days of our Lives most popular supercouples. Although he entered the story as an outright villain wedging himself violently in between another popular supercouple, Steve Johnson and Kayla Brady, Jack eventually grew to establish himself as a core main character in the Days mythos through his passion, outrageous sense of humor, redemption, and undying love for heroine Jennifer Horton.

The character has been a frequent winner of Soap Opera Digest Awards, including Outstanding Villain, multiple wins for Best Love Story (with Jennifer), Best Wedding (also with Jennifer) and Outstanding Comic Performance. Ashford was nominated for an Emmy for Outstanding Supporting Actor in 2012.

Storylines

When Jack came to Salem, he was seeking treatment for Hodgkin's disease. His father, Harper Deveraux hired Kayla Brady to be Jack's nurse, and when Steve "Patch" Johnson rejected her, she agreed to marry him. Unfortunately, the match was doomed. Kayla soon began cheating on Jack with Steve, and when he found out (from the newspaper, of all things), he raped her, and had Steve beaten up. A confrontation resulted in a fall off a roof, and Jack wound up needing a kidney. Unfortunately, the only viable donor was his birth brother, who just happened to be Steve (who only donated the kidney when their mother, Jo, asked him to). Kayla pressed charges (which were later dropped) and filed for divorce.

Sometime during this whole fiasco, Jack learned from Melissa Horton, who he had turned to when his marriage had gone sour (not realizing that Harper was trying to frame her for poisoning Kayla), that he was adopted. He turned his back on Harper (who he found out was sterile.) He learned that Jo Johnson was his mother, and Steve and Adrienne are his siblings. It was initially hard for him to accept, but Adrienne convinced Jack to at least try, and he made his mother's Christmas when he extended an olive branch...in the form of expensive emerald earrings.

Jack ran for his father's seat in the senate against Mickey Horton, Melissa's adoptive father, using her to get to him. When she learned the truth, she dumped him. Then he saw his chance for big money...he helped Victor Kiriakis break Harper out of prison for a portion of his fortune, but the plan went bad, and Harper ended up kidnapping Kayla (again). Steve saved her, and his father went back to jail.

Jack bought half the Spectator to keep them from running a story about him. He attempted to blackmail co-partner Diana Colville into selling her other half. Originally she refused, but he later got his hands on it. The Spectator is where Jack met college student Jennifer Horton. She was trying to help a homeless pregnant girl named Sally, and the two pretended to be married to give the baby a home. Their fantasy love turned into a real thing, but the return of Jennifer's childhood sweetheart, Emilio, put a wedge between them. When Melissa returned to town, she tried to push Jennifer and Emilio together, believing Jack had not changed his ways. Jack allowed this to happen believing he was unworthy of Jennifer all the while his actions spoke for him as he kept throwing monkey wrenches into Jennifer and Emilio's 'relationship'. Going so far as to kidnap Jennifer on her wedding day to Emilio.

Jack was interested to learn that Steve's ex, Marina, was blackmailing him into helping her find the family fortune. He broke a sane Isabella out of the asylum, and found out all about the treasure from her. After getting his hands on the key to the treasure, all he found was Loretta's diary...containing the secret to Isabella's paternity. Before giving her the diary, he removed those pages. Without revealing his identity, her father, Ernesto Toscano, planned a cruise to get revenge on his enemies and get the diary, inviting Jack, who took that opportunity to give Isabella the papers proving that Victor was her father. When a bomb exploded on board the ship, the passengers found their way to an island, where Jack and Jennifer made love. Jennifer was devastated when her cousin was presumed dead and Jack was there for her when Ernesto took out himself and Jennifer's cousin Hope Brady (or so they thought...).

When Harper returned to town (after having escaped from prison), Jack foiled his plan to kill Steve during his second marriage to Kayla by pushing him off the roof of the bell tower...killing him. His own marriage plans were interrupted when Jennifer stepped in for her high-school chum Katerina von Leuschner (now known as Dr. Carly Manning) and married Lawrence Alamain. When she didn't come back, Jack went looking for her, and ended up in a cell next to Katerina's brother, François, who he later discovered was the Brady's adoptive son, Frankie Brady. The two managed to escape with the help of Lawrence's father, Leopold Alamain (who died in the attempt).

When Jack returned to Salem, he hoped to pick up where he left off with Jennifer, and began planning their wedding. When he tried to get romantic with her, she pushed him away, calling him a rapist. He didn't know what was going on, but Jennifer seemed to want nothing to do with him, so he broke it off. When he learned that the Spectator was in trouble, he married Eve Donovan, who needed a husband to get her hands on Nick Corelli's fortune. Once Eve had her hands on the money, the marriage was annulled, and Jack again tried to get back with Jennifer. After nearly dying when the theme train they were in derailed, Jennifer finally admitted to Jack that she pushed him away because Lawrence had raped her. With Kimberly Brady's help, Jack found a video of Lawrence confessing to the rape, and he was sent to prison.

Jack and Jennifer finally married in a wild west show. Honeymooning in Universal Studios, they met Hawk Hawkins, a con man seeking to separate them from their money. With the help of his partner, Desirée, Hawk not only got himself a spot in the Deveraux home (after pretending he threw his back out at their place), but managed to convince Jack the FBI was after him. Jack fled, and Hawk managed to get hold of Jack's fortune. Before Hawk could leave Salem (with Jennifer in tow), Jack returned and convinced Hawk to admit to taking the money. Hawk went to jail, but Jack and Jennifer were still broke.

Finding out Jennifer was pregnant should have been the best moment of Jack's life, but he thought his Hodgkin's had returned, and that he would be leaving a widow with a baby girl. So he sold the Spectator to Julie Olson Williams, before learning he wasn't dying after all. With no home and no money, they accepted Bill Horton's offer to move into a house he'd owned for years. Abigail Johanna Deveraux was born in a cabin outside of town, and Jack got a job freelancing. When he discovered a journal hidden in the attic of the house, he tried to have it turned into a novel, but Kate Roberts turned him down, and then refused to return the manuscript. Unfortunately, Jack had been counting on that money...he'd stolen some money from Billie Reed (who was holding it for a crime boss) to buy the Spectator back, and had to sell it to Kate...who promptly fired him. When Jack learned shortly after that Abby had aplastic anemia, contracted because he had signed the wrong documents years before resulting in a polluted water well near their home, he decided Jennifer could never forgive him...and left Salem.

Jack wasn't seen or heard from for years, until he checked himself into The Meadows (using the name 'Clarke'), and met a woman named 'Monica'. The two realized they had a lot in common, and even became lovers. Imagine Jack's surprise when he found out Monica was none other than Laura Horton, his mother-in-law who had been released from the mental hospital after he'd left town. Jack returned to town and moved into the house like he'd never left...uncomfortable for Jennifer and Peter, but ideal for Jack to get his wife back. He had no idea that his mother-in-law had fallen in love with him.

When Peter Blake took Jennifer to his hometown of Aremid, Jack followed them, and befriended a young woman named Sarah, hoping she would help him. She told him all about the woman in white, but once it was discovered that she was dressing like her (she'd fallen in love with Jack), Jennifer and Peter discounted the story. The group returned to Salem, Sarah in tow. Jack hid her, until Peter found out and encouraged her to return to Aremid. After Hope saved her from stripping at the Blue Note, Jack took her back to Aremid. Later, he tried again in Aremid to break up Peter and Jennifer, until Peter revealed that Jack had an affair with Laura (to Laura). Also while in Aremid, Jack found the deed to the Blue Note with Peter's name on it (proving he was involved in his father's criminal activities), but before he could show Jennifer the pavilion caught fire...Jack was saved by Peter in the nick of time. Jennifer discovered Jack's affair with Laura when she walked in on Jack comforting her mother, and married Peter in her devastation (while Jack was in jail for arson, charges that were later dropped).

When Tony DiMera was murdered during the wedding reception and John Black the accused, Jack and Jennifer joined forces to prove his innocence. They went undercover at the Blue Moon, but just as they were about to prove Peter and Jude were linked, there was a police bust. Back in Aremid, Jude took Jennifer hostage, and Jack let him go to save Jennifer...who escaped on her own, complete with a matchbook containing the numbers to a bank account in the Cayman Islands. When the two went down there to check it out, Peter magically had the names on the account erased at the very moment they were accessing it. Then they learned that Bo Brady was looking for Hope Brady, who had disappeared, in Aremid, and joined the search. Jack watches Peter shoot Jude in cold blood, but everyone believes that Peter did it in self-defense.

Jack followed Peter and Jennifer to Paris, still trying to prove that Peter was dirty. He found some books that could work as proof, but then Peter blew up the tunnels, and Jack and Jennifer barely escaped. Then Jack found Daniel Scott, the man Peter had hired to romance Laura. When Jack agreed to pay his debts (after luring him into a high-stakes poker game), Daniel confessed his dealings with Peter to Jennifer. She wouldn't believe his word alone, but Laura backed her up. After returning to Salem, Peter paid Daniel to tell Jennifer that Jack had bribed him to tell her those lies. Unluckily for Peter, Jennifer went to Daniel on her own, and tricked him into telling her everything. Jack had been planning to leave town until he learned that Jennifer kicked Peter out, and hung around to protect his ex-wife and daughter. He found out Peter was planning to kidnap Jennifer and Abby, but the police couldn't do anything. Jack headed over to the house with a gun, and accidentally killed Peter in a struggle. He was arrested for his murder, and bailed out by Jennifer. Too bad for Jack, Stefano had blackmailed a judge, and Jack was sentenced to life. His cellmate in prison was 'Travis Malloy', a plant from Stefano DiMera. When 'Travis' was released, he moved in next door to Jennifer, as Trent Davis.

The retrial began, and everyone figured that the charges would be dismissed because Peter was alive. Kristen DiMera even agreed to testify to that fact, but Stefano's presence scared her into silence. He was sent back to prison, and Jennifer got a job there to help him expose the prison system (using Hope's credentials). A crooked guard, T.C., was assigned to Jack and took a liking to Jennifer, even attempting to rape her. Jack saved her by bribing a guard to take him to the warden's office, and was paid back for it with a beating, not knowing Jennifer was hiding in his cell. T.C. and Trent searched Jennifer's home and discovered she was posing as a guard, and Jack's visitors were limited to one person...his lawyer, Mickey Horton. When Stefano decided (as part of a master plan) to become a respected resident of Salem, Jennifer told him that nothing better happen to Jack, because he needed the support of the Hortons. He called T.C. to tell him not to hurt Jack, which came just in time...they were seconds away from killing him. Jack realized that T.C. was on the DiMera bankroll.

Jack got himself a new cellmate, Herbie, who used his girlfriend on the outside to sneak Jack the password that Jennifer had stolen for the warden's computer. He used it, and learned that 'Travis' was living next door to Jennifer as Trent Davis. Unfortunately, by the time he got word to Mickey, Trent had kidnapped Jennifer. Finding that out, Herbie helped Jack break out of prison, and he headed to the Grand Canyon to save her. In a fight between Trent and Jack, Trent fell to his death. He and Jennifer returned to Salem to spend Christmas with their family, but Jack snuck away to catch Peter...not realizing that Abby and Jennifer had tagged along. They ended up at a seedy motel, Peter hot on their tail, and ended up being members of the Ward's World-famous Circus, where Jack got a job as an animal keeper. Laura accidentally sent Peter right to them, but luckily, circus owner Jasper saved them.

Jack convinced the circus to head to Salem, with a plan to trap Peter, and sent tickets to Hope to get her to come. Unfortunately, Peter had tipped the FBI off to where Jack was hiding, and had him arrested. Jack was heartbroken when Abe came to the jail to tell him that Jennifer's car had crashed, and a dead woman had been found inside...presumed to be Jennifer. Jack was released from jail just long enough to attend Jennifer's funeral. Jack was exonerated of his crimes when Jennifer's 'spirit' convinced Peter to confess to his crimes. Upon returning home, Jack and Abby found a very life Jennifer, who told them about the plan the circus people had to fake her death and resurrection. Jack, Jennifer, and Abby all left Salem in June 1998 for a vacation in Africa.

While in Africa, something went wrong. The two never ended up getting married, and Jennifer ended up tending bar in Ireland. After Bo found her, she returned to Salem. Jack learned from Alice that she had gone to Paris for Greta's coronation, and turned up to try, one last time, to get his wife and daughter back. He has followed Jennifer back to Salem, and the two moved in together so they could look after Abigail. Jennifer initially pushed Jack away, and concentrated on relationships with first Brandon then Colin, but she and Jack couldn't resist that certain something that had always been between them. They were remarried, much to the delight of their daughter Abby.

Jack and Jennifer were just beginning to enjoy their married life together again, and to enjoy hosting In the House, a show that was one of Jennifer's father Bill Horton's wedding gifts to her and Jack. Then Jennifer was dealt the harshest blow of her life when Jack was struck down in an alley behind Salem Place by the Salem Stalker; however, unbeknownst to everyone in Salem, Jack wasn't really dead—he'd been kidnapped to a tropical island that was the spitting image of Salem! He tried to escape to make it back to Jennifer, but ended up lost in the jungle surrounding the compound. Luckily Patrick, Jennifer and Hope were also out there in the jungle, and Jack was there just in time to meet his brand new son. While trying to get back to Salem, Jack and Jennifer were separated and Jack was presumed dead again, but ended up in Tony's European castle being held prisoner.

Not one to be down and out, Jack was still determined to get home to Jennifer, and escaped from the DiMera castle, trying to make his way back to Salem. After numerous failed attempts, Jack managed to pair up with Cassie Brady, Marlena Evans and Roman Brady, and the four eventually made it back to Salem. Jack was happy to be home with his wife and children, but he soon began feeling sick, and when he went to Lexie, she advised him he only had a short period of time to live. Although Lexie and later Marlena tried to convince Jack to tell Jennifer, he was determined to enjoy the time he had left with his family without having them concentrate on his illness.

Convinced it was his job to make sure Jennifer was taken care of after his death, he began pushing Jennifer and Frankie to spend more time together. As soon as he thought the two were close again, Jack faked his death and "left" Salem, leaving Jennifer and Frankie to marry.

A few months later he encountered an orderly who looked exactly like his long-lost brother, Steve Johnson. It turned out that the orderly was Steve, and Jack insisted on a DNA test. Jack convinced Steve to return to Salem and reconnect with their family.

Jack returned during Jennifer's wedding to Frankie. Because her husband was still alive, Jennifer's marriage was invalid. Wanting Jennifer to be happy, Frankie found a cure for Jack's illness and Jack and Jennifer left for Europe together.

In the fall of 2010, Jennifer returned to Salem to settle Alice Horton's estate. Jack was not with her. Jack had decided to go on a "walk about" in Australia to search for himself and find the meaning of life - or so we thought.

In the fall of 2011, Jack returned to Salem with the real story of where he was for a year. He had been working on a case involving drug trafficking in Europe. He traced the source of the drugs to Afghanistan, lied to Jennifer, Abigail, and JJ Deveraux about where he was going, and snuck into the country. He was soon captured, held prisoner, and tortured. His contact made up the story about the "walk about" and kept up that image so that Jack's family would not know about the news story. When Jack was finally released, he returned to Salem to tell everyone the truth. However, Jennifer had already divorced Jack and moved on with Daniel, and Abigail was furious with Jack for lying to the family. Neither was ready to trust Jack again.

Adamant that he had changed and would not lie again, Jack set about getting his family back. But, his first step was to deal with the trauma of being captured and tortured. Jack had developed PTSD. He worked with Marlena and a support group to recover. Eventually, he was able to open up to Jennifer about it.

This led to the two of them reconciling and getting engaged. It also paved the way for Abigail and Jack to rebuild their relationship as well. And, Jack took a job teaching journalism at Salem U.

Jack and Jennifer supported Abe Carver through Lexie Carver's terminal diagnosis and death. And, after she died, they attended a memorial/autism fundraiser. However, there was a great explosion that night in the tunnels underneath Salem. Many buildings were damaged, including the banquet hall where Lexie's benefit was being held. Abigail was trapped in the elevator.

Jennifer, Jack, and Cameron Davis worked to get Abigail out. When they were able to pry the doors open a little, Jack went into the elevator to rescue Abigail. But, the elevator cables continued to break. Cameron and Jennifer were able to open the doors again and Jack pushed Abigail out. Then the doors closed and the final cables broke. The elevator crashed with Jack inside. Roman reported that the EMTs pronounced Jack dead upon impact.

Jack however returned to Salem with Eve Donovan at his side, at the annual New Year's Eve celebration at Doug's Place. He had amnesia and didn't remember anyone or anything about Salem.

In 2021, Jack discovers that he has another daughter named Gwendolyn "Gwen" Rizczech, from his previous relationship with Tiffany Rizczech, before he came to Salem. Gwen despises Jack for abandoning her as a child, which is why she despises her younger sister, Abigail for getting all the attention that should have been hers after Gwen drugged Abigail in the early 2020. However, Jack claims he doesn't remember her mother. However, it is later confirmed that Jack didn't know about her or her mother, because Jack's mother in-law, Laura Horton was the one who was paying Tiffany to stay away in order to preserve her daughter Jennifer's marriage to Jack.

References

External links 
Jack at soapcentral.com

Days of Our Lives characters
Adoptee characters in television
Fictional American politicians
Fictional newspaper publishers (people)
Fictional rapists
Fictional criminals in soap operas
Male villains
Male characters in television
Fictional writers
Fictional characters incorrectly presumed dead